Pat Bird (born 1965), is a male international Canadian lawn bowler.

Bowls career

Asia Pacific
Bird won a bronze medal in the fours with Rob Law, Cam Lefresne and Greg Wilson at the 2019 Asia Pacific Bowls Championships, held in the Gold Coast, Queensland.

References

Canadian male bowls players
Living people
1965 births